The 1918 Swarthmore Quakers football team was an American football team that represented Swarthmore College as an independent in the 1918 college football season. In their second season under head coach Leroy Mercer, the Quakers compiled a 4–2 record and outscored opponents by a total of 116 to 38.

Schedule

References

Swarthmore
Swarthmore Garnet Tide football seasons
Swarthmore Quakers football